Kashmar (also Romanized as Kāshmar; formerly  Keshmar,  Torshīz or  Soltanabad) is a city and the capital of Kashmar County, in Razavi Khorasan Province, Iran. Kashmar is located near the river Shesh Taraz in the western part of the province, and south of the province's capital Mashhad, in Iran, from east to Bardaskan, west to Torbat-e Heydarieh, north to Nishapur, south to Gonabad. Until two centuries ago, this city was named Torshiz. At the 2006 census, its population was 81,527, in 21,947 families.

Historical legends 
Kashmar is a city with ancient history and many legendary stories Among the historical legends are about the Cypress of Kashmar.

Cypress of Kashmar 

The Cypress of Kashmar is a mythical cypress tree of legendary beauty and gargantuan dimensions. It is said to have sprung from a branch brought by Zoroaster from Paradise and to have stood in today's Kashmar in northeastern Iran and to have been planted by Zoroaster in honor of the conversion of King Vishtaspa to Zoroastrianism. According to the Iranian physicist and historian Zakariya al-Qazwini King Vishtaspa had been a patron of Zoroaster who planted the tree himself. In his ʿAjā'ib al-makhlūqāt wa gharā'ib al-mawjūdāt, he further describes how the Al-Mutawakkil in 247 AH (861 AD) caused the mighty cypress to be felled, and then transported it across Iran, to be used for beams in his new palace at Samarra. Before, he wanted the tree to be reconstructed before his eyes. This was done in spite of protests by the Iranians, who offered a very high sum of money to save the tree. Al-Mutawakkil never saw the cypress, because he was murdered by a Turkish soldier (possibly in the employ of his son) on the night when it arrived on the banks of the Tigris.

Fire Temple of Kashmar 

Kashmar Fire Temple was the first Zoroastrian fire temple built by Vishtaspa at the request of Zoroaster in Kashmar. In a part of Ferdowsi's Shahnameh, the story of finding Zarathustra and accepting Vishtaspa's religion is regulated that after accepting Zoroastrian religion, Vishtaspa sends priests all over the universe And Azar enters the fire temples (domes) and the first of them is Adur Burzen-Mihr who founded in Kashmar and planted a cypress tree in front of the fire temple and made it a symbol of accepting the Bahai religion And he sent priests all over the world, and commanded all the famous men and women to come to that place of worship.

Religion 
The city is fourth pilgrimage city in Iran and it is the second most pilgrimage city after Mashhad in Razavi Khorasan Province.

Education 

At present, Kashmar has five higher education centers, including Payame Noor University of Kashmar, Islamic Azad University of Kashmar, Jihad University of Kashmar, Kashmar Higher Education Center and the School of Nursing. According to the statistics of the above institute, 3,794,420 students are studying in the country's universities, of which about 3,500 are Kashmir students.

Souvenirs 
The city is a major producer of raisins and has about 40 types of grapes. It is also internationally recognized for exporting saffron and handmade Persian rugs. The main souvenirs of this city are the Kashmar carpet, raisins, grapes, saffron, dried fruits, and the confectionary sohan.

Kashmar carpet 
Kashmar carpet is a regional Persian carpet named after its origin, the city of Kashmar, that is produced throughout the Kashmar County. The carpets are handmade and are often available with landscape and hunting designs. The history of carpet weaving in Kashmar dates back to 150 years and the contemporary art of carpet weaving dates back to 1920. However, between 1260 and 1280, mass production of carpets was recorded by historians. The first master weaver in the Kashmar region was Mohammad Kermani, who, despite his last name, was not from Kerman, but people say he was born in a village called Forutqeh near Kashmar. According to historians, the master weaver brought the knowledge of carpet weaving from Kerman province, and his first work was probably commissioned by Saeed Hossein Sajjadi, a native and resident of Forutqeh and a famous carpet manufacturer.

Historical sites, ancient artifacts and tourism

Tomb of Hassan Modarres 

The Tomb of Sayyid Hassan Modarres is the burial site of Sayyid Hassan Modares, former Prime Minister of Iran. It was built in 1937 in Kashmar, Iran, as opposed to using the former tomb of Kashmar in the vast gardens of Kashmar. The tomb building consists of a central dome, four dock and a dome made of turquoise, in the style of Islamic architecture and the Safavid dynasty. Seyed Hassan Modares lived during the Pahlavi dynasty and was from the Sadat of Tabatabai. He was a political constitutionalist.

Hassan Modarres Museum 

The Hassan Modarres Museum is a Museum belongs to the 21st century and is located in Kashmar, Razavi Khorasan Province in Iran.

Imamzadeh Seyed Morteza 

Imamzadeh Seyed Morteza is related to the Qajar dynasty and is located in Razavi Khorasan Province, Kashmar. Massive trees, waterfalls and swimming pools add to the attractions of this place, and on the other hand, a good number of living rooms provide a good base for traveling to this place, as well as the many shops and dining halls.

Imamzadeh Hamzeh, Kashmar 

Imamzadeh Hamzah, Kashmar the oldest mosque in Kashmar, includes the tomb of Hamza al-Hamza ibn Musa al-Kadhim, the garden and the public cemetery, and is as an Imamzadeh.

Jameh Mosque of Kashmar 

Jameh Mosque of Kashmar, the place where Jumu'ah is performed, was built in Kashmar in 1791 by Fath-Ali Shah Qajar. This Mosque is opposite the Amin al-tojar Caravansarai.

Jameh Mosque of Khalilabad 

Jameh Mosque of Khalilabad dates back to the Pahlavi dynasty and is located in Khalilabad, Razavi Khorasan Province.

Haji Jalal Mosque 

Haji Jalal Mosque is a Qajar dynasty period mosque in Kashmar, Razavi Khorasan Province.

Kohneh Castle, Zendeh Jan 

Kohneh Castle is a Castle related to the 1st millennium and is located in the Kashmar County, Zendeh Jan village.

Sir Cave 

Sir Cave is a cave in Sir village of the Central District of Bardaskan County in Razavi Khorasan Province. The cave was inhabited in the past and was used as a shelter. Sir Cave is located on a rocky mountain with a height of about 80 meters and about 1608 meters above sea level. It is difficult to reach.

Atashgah Manmade-Cave 

Atashgah Castle 

Atashgah Castle is a castle in the city of Kashmar, and is one of the attractions of Kashmar. This castle was built by the Sasanian government and it was famous in ancient times.

Rig Castle 

Rig castle is a Castle related to the Seljuq dynasty and is located in the Kashmar County, Quzhd village.

Rahmanniyeh Castle 

Rahmanniyeh Castle is a historical castle located in Bardaskan County in Razavi Khorasan Province, The longevity of this fortress dates back to the 8th to 12th centuries AH.

Kondor Castle 

Kondor Castle is a historical castle located in Khalilabad County in Razavi Khorasan Province, The longevity of this fortress dates back to the 5th to 7th centuries AH.

Qal'eh Dokhtar, Khooshab 

Qaleh Dokhtar is a historical castle located in Bardaskan County in Razavi Khorasan Province, The longevity of this fortress dates back to the 6th to 8th centuries AH.

Qal'eh Dokhtar, Kuhsorkh 

Qal'eh Dokhtar is a historical castle located in Kuhsorkh County in Razavi Khorasan Province, The longevity of this fortress dates back to the Nizari Ismaili state.

Qal'eh Dokhtar, Doruneh 

Qal'eh Dokhtar is a historical castle located in Bardaskan County in Razavi Khorasan Province, The longevity of this fortress dates back to the 6th to 9th centuries AH.

Amin al-tojar Caravansarai 

Amin al-tojar Caravansarai  is a caravanserai related to the Qajar dynasty and is located in Kashmar. This Caravansarai is opposite the Jameh Mosque of Kashmar.

Aliabad Tower 

This tower is located in Aliabad-e Keshmar, 42 km from Kashmar city. This tower is built on the castle and its minaret is similar to the tower and its facade is made of decorative brick inlay. This dome is 18 meters. Tall with an octagonal interior. This tower is in the historical records.

Firuzabad Tower 

This minaret is made of brick and there are inscriptions on it called "Kufic" which dates back to the late 7th century AH. Although the minaret is made of simple brick – the bricks are laid in a zigzag pattern to enhance its beauty. Inside the minaret, the remains of a staircase can be seen and holes are inscribed on the minaret. Currently, this minaret is 18 meters high.

Nameq Village 

Nameq is located in a hilly area and many mountains surround the village. It has many historical sites, for example, the tomb of the great Gnostic Sheikh Abol Hassan (father of Sheikh Ahmad-e Jami) is located 500 meters. From the village in a green plain. In addition, there are the remains of an ancient castle, pre-Islamic and post-Islamic cemeteries, a citadel, mosques and other beautiful pieces of architecture.

Shahi Dam 

Shahi Dam was built about 700–1000 years ago and located in Kariz, Kuhsorkh County.

Seyyed Bagher Ab anbar 

The Seyed Bagher Ab anbar is a historical Ab anbar of Qajar dynasty that is located in city center of Bardaskan, in Ghaem Avenue. This Ab anbar was added to the list of National Monuments of Iran As the 11034st monument.

Firuzabad area 

The Firuzabad area is a historical area related to the Pre-Islamic period and is located in Bardaskan County, Central District, Firuzabad village.

Haj Soltan Religious School 

This school is one of the buildings of the Qajar era, which has a central courtyard and is surrounded on four sides by two-story rooms and two north and south porches.

Gabar Hesar Castle 

Gabar Hesar Castle is a Castle related to the second century AH and is located in the Kuhsorkh County.

Darone Cave 

Darone Cave is a cave in Bardaskan County, Iran. It is located in Cave Doruneh, Bardaskan.

Baghdasht Peak 

Baghdasht mountain range, the largest peak of which is 2500 meters above sea level, is part of the Rivash heights and is located near the village of Kariz, 25 km northwest of Kashmar.

Talaabad Watermill 

Talaabad Watermill is a Watermill related to the late Safavid period and is located in Kashmar County, Central District, Quzhd village.

Tomb of Abdolabad 

The Tomb of Abdolabad is a historical tomb and chahartaqi of Ilkhanate era in Abdolabad village at Bardaskan County.The tomb was added to the list of National Monuments of Iran as the 10,908th monument.

Kondor Ab anbars 

Kondor Ab anbars is two historical Ab anbars belongs to the first Pahlavi period and is located in Khalilabad County, Sheshtaraz District, Kondor village.

Yakhchāl of Kashmar 

The Yakhchāl of Kashmar is a historical Yakhchāl belongs to the Qajar dynasty and is located in Kashmar County, Razavi Khorasan Province.

Arg of Kashmar 

Arg of Kashmar Or Arg of Hosen is a historical Citadel located in Kashmar County in Razavi Khorasan Province, The lifespan of this building goes back to Qajar dynasty.

Imamzadeh Hassan, Khalilabad 

Imamzadeh Hassan is a Imamzadeh belongs to the Qajar dynasty and is located in Khalilabad County, Razavi Khorasan Province in Iran.

Imamzadeh Mohammad 

Imamzadeh Mohammad is a Imamzadeh belongs to the History of modern and is located in Kashmar County, Razavi Khorasan Province in Iran.

Imamzadeh Qasem, Khalilabad 

Imamzadeh Qasem is a Imamzadeh in Khalilabad County, Razavi Khorasan Province in Iran.

Bezanjerd Castle 

Bezanjerd Castle is a historical castle located in Bezanjerd in Razavi Khorasan Province, The longevity of this fortress dates back to the More than 200 years.

Grave of Pir Quzhd 

Grave of Pir Quzhd is a historical Grave related to the Before the 11th century AH and is located in Quzhd, Razavi Khorasan Province.

Ribat of Kabudan 

Ribat of Kabudan is a historical Ribat related to the Qajar dynasty and is located in Kabudan, Razavi Khorasan Province.

Band-e Qara Bathhouse 

Band-e Qara Bathhouse is a historical Public bathing related to the Qajar dynasty and is located in Band-e Qara, Razavi Khorasan Province.

Band-e Qara Glacier 

Band-e Qara Glacier is a Glacier is located in Band-e Qara, Razavi Khorasan Province.

Qanats of Quzhd 

The Qanats of Quzhd is a historical Qanat is located in Quzhd in Kashmar County.

Yakhchāl of Geli 

The Yakhchāl of Geli is a historical Yakhchāl belongs to the Qajar dynasty and is located in Kalilabad, Razavi Khorasan Province in Iran.

Khalilabad Hot Spring 

The Khalilabad Hot Spring is a Hot spring is located in Khalilabad County, Razavi Khorasan Province in Iran.

Qadamgah Hazrat Ali 

The Qadamgah Hazrat Ali is a historical place belongs to the Qajar dynasty and is located in Khalilabad County, Razavi Khorasan Province in Iran.

Beheshti Bathhouse 

Beheshti Bathhouse is a historical Public bathing related to the Pahlavi dynasty and is located in Khalilabad, Razavi Khorasan Province.

Nameq Cemetery 

The Nameq Cemetery is a historical cemetery related to the Safavid dynasty and is located in Nameq.

Nameq Castle 

Nameq Castle is a historical castle located in Nameq in Razavi Khorasan Province, The longevity of this fortress dates back to the Before the Mongol conquest.

Seyed Morteza Forest Park 

The Seyed Morteza Forest Park is a Forest Park is located in Kashmar, Razavi Khorasan Province in Iran.

Ultralight Airport Kashmar 

Ultralight Airport Kashmar is an airport in the city of Kashmar in Iran, which is located on a 17-hectare land in the southwest of Razavi Khorasan province, about 240 kilometers from the city of Mashhad; And with one runway, it has the capacity to accept all light and ultralight aircraft.

Notable people

Manouchehr Eghbal 

Manuchehr Eqbal (13 October 1909 – 25 November 1977) was an Iranian royalist politician. He held office as the Prime Minister of Iran from 1957 to 1960. He served as the minister of health in Ahmad Ghavam's cabinet, minister of culture in Abdolhosein Hazhir's cabinet, minister of transportation in RajabAli Mansur's cabinet, and interior minister in Mohammad Sa'ed's cabinet. He also served as the governor of East Azarbaijan province. In 1957, he became prime minister, replacing Hussein Ala. Eghbal continued as prime minister until fall 1960 and was replaced by Sharif Emami. Until his death, he served as a top executive in Iran's National Oil Company. He was also one of the close aides to the Shah.

Fateme Ekhtesari 

Fateme Ekhtesari, also Fatemeh Ekhtesari, (born 1986) is an Iranian poet. Ekhtesari lived in Karaj and she writes in Persian. In 2013, she appeared at the poetry festival in Gothenburg (Göteborgs poesifestival). After she arrived back in Iran she was imprisoned and later released on bail. Her verdict came in 2015 when she was sentenced to 99 lashes and 11.5 years imprisonment for crimes against the Iranian government, for immoral behaviour and blasphemy.

Alireza Faghani 

Alireza Faghani (born 21 March 1978) is an Iranian international football referee who has been officiating in the Persian Gulf Pro League for several seasons and has been on the FIFA list since 2008. Faghani has refereed important matches such as the 2014 AFC Champions League Final, the 2015 AFC Asian Cup Final, the 2015 FIFA Club World Cup Final , the 2016 Olympic football final match. He has refereed matches in the 2017 Liga 1 , 2017 FIFA Confederations Cup, 2018 FIFA World Cup in Russia and the 2019 AFC Asian Cup. Alireza migrated to Australia in September 2019.

Fereydoun Jeyrani 

Fereydoun Jeyrani (born in 1951, Bardaskan) is an Iranian film director, screenwriter, and Television presenter. He was the director, producer and host of haft (Seven) (an Iranian television series about Iranian Cinema) until 2012. Along with his unconventional performance in Haft, he is best known for directing Red, The Season Salad, Water and Fire, Pink and I am a Mother. Jeyrani TV Host Haft First series.

Mohammad Khazaee 

Mohammad Khazaee (born 12 April 1953 in Kashmar, Iran) is the former Ambassador of Iran to the United Nations. He presented his credentials to the United Nations Secretary-General Ban Ki-moon in July 2007. He was elected as Vice President of the United Nations General Assembly on 14 September 2011.

Ali Rahmani 

Ali Rahmani (علی رحمانی) was born in Kashmar (25 May 1967). He was the first managing director of Tehran Stock Exchange. He is an associate professor at Alzahra University.

Iran Teymourtash 

Iran Teymourtāsh (1914–1991), the eldest daughter of Abdolhossein Teymourtāsh, is considered a pioneer among women activists in 20th-century Iran. Her father's position as the second most powerful political personality in Iran, from 1925 to 1932, afforded Iran Teymourtāsh the opportunity to play a prominent role in that country's women's affairs early in life.

Military operations

Iran–U.S. RQ-170 incident 

On 5 December 2011, an American Lockheed Martin RQ-170 Sentinel unmanned aerial vehicle (UAV) was captured by Iranian forces near the city of Kashmar in northeastern Iran. The Iranian government announced that the UAV was brought down by its cyberwarfare unit which commandeered the aircraft and safely landed it, after initial reports from Western news sources disputedly claimed that it had been "shot down". The United States government initially denied the claims but later President Obama acknowledged that the downed aircraft was a US drone. Iran filed a complaint to the UN over the airspace violation. Obama asked Iran to return the drone. Iran is said to have produced drones based on the captured RQ-170.

Ban of Americans 
In 2018, a pair of American citizens were issued hunting permits by the city of Kashmar. This was seen as irregular, and a commission was formed to protect the interests of the city against foreign influence. All involved departments were investigated severely and American citizens were banned from entering the city.

Kashmar Great earthquake 

The Kashmar earthquake occurred on 25 September 1903, at 1:20 am UTC time in Iran. Its magnitude is 6.5 on the Richter scale. The U.S. Geological Survey also estimated the quake at   E and its magnitude was 6.5 on the Richter scale..

The death toll from the earthquake was about 200.

Geographical location 
Kashmar County with two central district and Farah Dasht, and to the center of Kashmar city has occupied an area of about 3390 square kilometers of Khorasan Razavi province With the County of Kuhsorkh. This city is adjacent to Khalilabad from the west, to Nishapur, Sabzevar and Bardaskan from the north and northwest, to Torbat-e Heydarieh from the east and northeast, and to the Feyzabad from the south and southwest. Kashmar city has two mountainous areas of the Rivash in the north and Fagan Bajestan heights in the south and desert and arid regions in the west and south and fertile plains in the suburbs and its towns. In terms of climate, it can be said that Kashmar has all three types of climate because the northern parts of the city are mountainous and cold, the central regions are temperate and the southern regions are arid and semi-arid due to its proximity to the Lut desert.

Climate 
Köppen-Geiger climate classification system classifies its climate as cold semi-arid (BSk) with short, cool winters and long, hot summers.

Gallery

References

External links 

 Kashmar in AccuWeather

 
Achaemenid cities
Parthian cities
Populated places in Kashmar County
Shia holy cities
Cities in Razavi Khorasan Province
Nishapur Quarter
Sasanian cities
Seleucid colonies
Kashmar County
Ancient Iranian cities
Holy cities